The World RX of Germany is a Rallycross event held in Germany for the FIA World Rallycross Championship. The event made its debut in the 2014 season, at the Estering circuit in the town of Buxtehude, Lower Saxony, before being moved to the Nürburgring, Nürburg in 2020. The World RX of Germany is held annually in Germany and is one of the major events on the World RX calendar.

Past winners

References

Germany
Auto races in Germany